The Allison J102 was a turbojet engine developed as a supersonic missile engine by the Allison Engine Company.

Operational history
The J102-100 is an axial flow turbojet that was first run in March 1991. In 1997 it was being considered for use in a sea-skimming supersonic target for the United States Navy.
.

References

Notes

1990s turbojet engines
J102